Workmate may refer to:

Co-worker
Workbench
Black & Decker Workmate, a portable sawhorse and general carpentry tool.